Henry Wilcocks DCL was an English priest in the early 16th-century.

Wilcocks was educated at the University of Oxford. He became Chief Moderator of the Civil Law School at Oxford in 1501; and an  advocate of Doctors' Commons in 1511. He held livings at Wood Eaton, Eynsham and Haseley. He became a Canon of Lincoln Cathedral in 1504, Vicar general of the Diocese of Lincoln in 1511 and Archdeacon of Leicester in 1515.

Notes 

Archdeacons of Leicester
16th-century English people
Lincoln Cathedral
Alumni of the University of Oxford